The Water Knife is a 2015 science fiction novel by Paolo Bacigalupi. It is Bacigalupi's sixth novel, and is based on his short story, The Tamarisk Hunter, first published in the news magazine High Country News. It takes place in the near future, where drought brought on by climate change has devastated the Southwestern United States.

Central characters
Angel Velasquez was born in Mexico and fled the country with his father after gang members murdered his mother and sister. After being released from prison by Catherine Case, Angel now works for her as her most trusted "water knife"; a hired henchman, assassin and spy who sneaks into the water boards of Nevada’s rival states, California and Arizona, sabotaging and destroying their water supplies. 
Lucy Monroe is a Pulitzer winning journalist who has stayed in Phoenix longer than she intended to, making a dangerous living reporting on the water wars. She can’t seem to abandon the chaos that surrounds her, hoping for that one big story. She knows far more about Phoenix's water secrets than she admits.
Maria Villarosa is a young Texas refugee and orphan, doing her best to survive just one more day. She is trying to get enough money together to leave the drought stricken region, and has dreams of escaping to the north where water still falls from the sky.

Major themes
Major themes include: water shortage and drought, climate change, corporate greed, social hierarchy, refugee crises and fabricated arcologies.

Glossary of sci-fi terminology 

 Arcology: High-tech, highly coveted living spaces with advanced water recycling capabilities. They are largely self-sufficient buildings that can support hydroponic farms and refuge from the desert heat.
 Clearsac: A ubiquitous technology used to recycle urine into drinking water.
 Fivers: A person of high status. According to an interview with the author, "Fivers are people with five-digit addresses, desirable addresses, which means they live in the Taiyang Arcology, the only rich place in Phoenix."
 Merry Perrys: Religious zealots actively recruiting Texan refugees to their faith. According to an interview with the author, "The Merry Perrys are based on Rick Perry. Back in the 2011 drought, he was the governor of Texas and a presidential candidate. In the middle of this terrible drought he was organizing prayer circles, urging people to pray for rain."
 Zoners: According to an interview with the author, "Zoners are people from Arizona who are down on their luck."

Reception
Hugo Award winner Jason Heller said "Bacigalupi plays on a grand scale, but he does so with a keen eye for detail, from the designer dust masks worn by the rich to the construction printers used on an industrial scale (like giant 3-D printers), for the building of Southern Nevada Water Authority super resorts. His big triumph, though, is never forgetting that The Water Knife is a thriller at its pounding heart. Even amid reams of deeply researched information about the economy, geology, history and politics of water rights and usage in the United States, he keeps the plot taut and the dialogue slashing".

In his review for The Washington Post, Héctor Tobar writes that "Bacigalupi is a grim, efficient and polished narrator" and creates a "twisted fictional landscape" that is a "vision of the near-future that borrows heavily from the strangeness and conflicts of the present". Tobar also states that some of the inventions used in the novel reek of stereotypes: "Mexico, for example, has devolved into a series of political entities called the Cartel States...but a powerful journalist named Lucy Monroe and a refugee from Texas named María Villarosa provide feminine wiles and a much-needed antidote to the book’s relentless bursts of testosterone-driven prose". Overall, Tobar suggests that fans of Bacigalupi's previous novel, The Windup Girl, will surely "enjoy losing themselves in these nearly 400 pages of climate sci-fi, or cli-fi, as it’s now called".

The Denver Post called the novel a "blockbuster" writing that the characters in the book are "dragged together by fate, make bargains with each other and with themselves, and sometimes manage to rise to the level of anti-hero...there’s a little more techno-jargon, there are explosions and helicopters, breathless action and genuine suspense...this is a rich and, yes, gritty world from a smart author who knows the American Southwest well and knows readers better".

Denise Hamilton said that the book brought to mind the movie Chinatown, saying that while "one is set in the past and the other in a dystopian future, both are neo-noir tales with jaded antiheroes and ruthless kingpins who wield water as lethal weapons to control life - and mete out death". Hamilton further opines that "Bacigalupi's use of water as sacred currency" evokes the novel Dune and the "violence and slang" may also bring to mind the film, A Clockwork Orange. However, Hamilton notes that the book is not a pastiche; "Bacigalupi weaves an engrossing tale all his own, crackling with edgy style...and he makes water politics sexy, laying down the jargon and technical details early, then hurrying back to the action-filled streets...the ultimate villains here aren't the hired assassins or lowly water engineers but the faceless corporate owners who play God, deciding if entire regions live or die".

References

External links
Wind Up Stories - Fiction by Paolo Bacigalupi

2015 American novels
2015 science fiction novels
American science fiction novels
Dystopian novels
Biopunk novels
Climate change novels
Novels set in Phoenix, Arizona
Novels by Paolo Bacigalupi
Water scarcity in fiction
Deserts in fiction
Alfred A. Knopf books